Fangshan Township is a coastal rural township in Pingtung County, Taiwan.

Geography

Population: 5,093 (February 2023) 
Area:

Administrative divisions
The township comprises the four villages of Fangshan, Fenggang, Jialu and Shanyu.

Economy
The township is famous for its Aiwen mangoes, which are exported to Asian countries.

Infrastructure

Submarine communication cables
Fangshan is one of the two cable landing points of Taiwan island (the other one is Toucheng). Four submarine communication cables, including C2C and SEA-ME-WE 3, connect here.

Tourist attractions
 Fangshan Post Office

Transportation
The township is served by Neishi Station and Jialu Station of the Taiwan Railways South-Link Line.

Notable natives
 Tsai Ing-wen, President of Taiwan

References

External links

Fangshan Government website  

Townships in Pingtung County